Cat #1 is the fourth solo studio album released by former Kiss drummer Peter Criss, and first under the band name Criss. Criss re-recorded the Kiss song "Beth" for the album. Unlike the orchestrated original version, the new recording was an acoustic version. The album also features former-Kiss bandmate Ace Frehley playing guitar on three tracks.

Background 
In 1993, Criss released a special limited edition preview EP compact disc entitled Criss for the forthcoming album. Three tracks were eventually released on the 1994 CD while two tracks were only available on the limited edition CD.

Release and legacy 
For the cover art, it was Criss' idea to paint half of his face in his original Kiss makeup, while leaving the other half plain. The idea was to link past and present. 

A CD single was released in Europe in 1998 which included three tracks from the album, including "Beth". A promotional video was produced for "Show Me", which was aired on MTV. The album did not chart in any territory. 

The album was re-released on colored vinyl in 2019 and included the two tracks from the limited edition CD.

Track listing
"Bad Attitude" (Peter Criss, Mark Montague, Carrion) – 4:33
"Walk the Line" (Criss, Montague) – 3:47
"The Truth" (Montague, Criss, Tosetti) – 4:53
"Bad People Burn in Hell" (Criss, Naro) – 3:46
"Show Me" (Montague, Mike Stone, Criss, Bardowell) – 4:03
"Good Times" (Criss, Kirk Miller, Montague) – 4:37
"Strike" (Criss, Montague) – 4:45
"Blue Moon over Brooklyn" (Criss, Naro) – 5:22
"Down With the Sun" (Criss, Montague) – 4:37
"We Want You" (Carrion, Montague) – 3:47
"Beth" (Criss, Stan Penridge, Bob Ezrin) – 2:27

Limited Edition tracks
"The Cat" (Criss/Montague/Miller/Stone) - 4:36
"Show Me"
"Good Times"
"What You're Doin'" (Criss/Montague/Stone/Miller) - 3:09
"Beth"

Credits

Band
Peter Criss – lead vocals, drums, percussion
Mark Montague – bass guitar, backing vocals, vocals on tracks 7 and 10.
Mike Stone – rhythm guitar, vocals on track 5.
Mike McLaughlin – lead guitar

Guest musicians
Ace Frehley – lead guitar on "Bad Attitude", "Walk the Line", and "Blue Moon over Brooklyn"
Wayne Johnsen – acoustic guitar on "Beth"
Kirk Miller – guitar
Dito Godwin – piano on "Blue Moon over Brooklyn", slide guitar on "The Cat", backing vocals
Doug Shawe – piano
Stephen Presley – keyboards
Ed Kanon – cymbals

1994 albums
Peter Criss albums